The Vale of Neath (or Neath Valley, Welsh: Cwm Nedd), one of the South Wales Valleys, encompasses the upper reaches of the River Neath in southwest Wales.  In addition to the River Neath, it is traversed by the Neath Canal and the A465 dual carriageway.

Settlements in the valley include Neath, Cadoxton, Tonna, Aberdulais, Resolven, Blaengwrach, Glynneath and Pontneddfechan.

Coal mining was an industry in the valley with mining operations being located at Aberpergwm and Pentreclwydau near Glynneath.

Waterfall Country

"Waterfall Country" is a nickname given to the Vale of Neath due to the diverse number of waterfalls in the valley.  In the upper reaches of the valley, at the foothills of the Brecon Beacons, are the waterfalls of four or five rivers: the Afon Hepste, Nedd Fechan, Afon Pyrddin, Afon Mellte and Afon Sychryd. In the lower valley, waterfalls can be found at Melincourt and Aberdulais.

Vale of Neath Railway
Currently partly used as a goods line the Vale of Neath Railway once served the area for passenger trains.

Notes

External links
Aberpergwm Drift
www.geograph.co.uk : photos of the Vale of Neath and surrounding area

 
Neath